Norberto "Beto" Menéndez (14 December 1936 – 26 May 1994) was an Argentine footballer striker. He was born in 1936 in the city of Buenos Aires, Argentina. He scored one goal for the Argentina national team at the 1958 World Cup in Sweden, against Northern Ireland, adding to Argentina's only victory in the tournament, 3–1. Menéndez won six Primera Division Argentina titles during his career. He has the distinction of being the only footballer who, having played for the two giants of the Argentine league (Boca Juniors and River Plate), won three league championships each, respectively. He was also the first player of Argentina's national team to have scored a goal at the qualification standings of a World Cup, on 13 October 1957 against Chile.

Club career
Menéndez started his playing career with River Plate in 1954, where he composed a famous couple of strikers along with Enríque Omar Sívori, winning three consecutive championships (1955–1956–1957). In 1961 he moved to Huracán, with little success. He signed for River's archrivals Boca Juniors in 1962, where he played 123 matches and scored 31 goals in all competitions and won the leagues of 1962, 1964 and 1965. In 1968 Menéndez moved to Colón de Santa Fe, and ended his career playing for Defensor of Uruguay.

Titles 
River Plate
 Primera División (3): 1955, 1956, 1957 

Boca Juniors
 Primera División (3): 1962, 1964, 1965

References

External links

 Beto Menéndez, todo un grande
FIFA player statistics: Norberto Menéndez

1936 births
1994 deaths
Footballers from Buenos Aires
Argentine footballers
Argentine expatriate footballers
Association football forwards
Argentina international footballers
Argentine Primera División players
Club Atlético Huracán footballers
Club Atlético River Plate footballers
Boca Juniors footballers
Defensor Sporting players
Club Atlético Colón footballers
Expatriate footballers in Uruguay
1958 FIFA World Cup players
Pan American Games medalists in football
Pan American Games gold medalists for Argentina
Footballers at the 1955 Pan American Games
Medalists at the 1955 Pan American Games